Kunal Ganjawala (born 14 April 1972) is an Indian playback singer whose songs are mostly featured in Hindi and Kannada films. He has also sung in Marathi, Bengali and other official languages of India. Kunal began his career by singing jingles. He came to limelight in Hindi cinema with the song "Bheege Honth Tere" from the film Murder in 2004. It was his first biggest hit. The song earned him Zee Cine Award as Best Playback Singer in 2005. He came to limelight in Kannada cinema with the song "Neene Neene" from the film Aakash in 2005.

Career 
Ganjawala graduated from St. Peter's School, Maza Gaon, Mazagaon. Kunal wanted to be either a chartered accountant or an actor. Kunal admits that it was his parents' support which made him possible to become a singer. Kunal's sister is a Bharatnatyam exponent, while his father plays the harmonica. With his parents' support he took singing seriously and started believing that he can become a singer.

Later, Ganjawala learned music from Bharatiya Vidya Bhavan under the guidance of Sudhindra Bhaumick. His first singing assignment was a Ranjit Barot-composed jingle titled Doodh Doodh for the Operation Flood advertisement. Ganjawala has said that he was taken seriously by other music directors because he was working with Barot.

Ganjawala's first break in Bollywood was Ab Ke Baras in 2002. Although the song did not mark him as a prominent singer, it earned him many offers. Thereafter he sang in many movies, such as Saathiya (2002), Indian Babu (2003), Paisa Vasool (2004), Khakee (2004), Rudraksh (2004), Dhoom (2004) and Meenaxi (2004). His breakthrough hit was "Bheege Hont Tere", from the film Murder, which won the 2005 Zee Cine Award Best Playback Singer – Male and IIFA Best Male Playback Award.

Ganjawala entered the Kannada film industry in 2005. His very first song in Kannada, Neene Neene composed by music director R P Patnaik and written by K. Kalyan for the movie Akash, was a hit of the year. His big break in South India came in 2006 from the Kannada blockbuster film Mungaru Male. His song "Onde Ondu Sari" written by Kaviraj and composed by music director Mano Murthy became the biggest hit of the year. It created records, including for highest sales and downloads.

Popular singer Sonu Nigam who is also known in South India for his hundreds of Kannada songs, recently composed a theme song for the Karnataka Bulldozer's team in the Celebrity Cricket League. With lyrics by Sowmya Raoh, this was sung by the trio of Ganjawala, Nigam and Raoh. Ganjawala has sung nearly 450 Kannada Songs thus far.

He has participated in Sa Re Ga Ma, an Indian singing talent competition on Zee TV (now Sa Re Ga Ma Pa) when it was hosted by Nigam. He was a judge on Amul Star Voice of India, another singing competition on Star TV, together with Shreya Ghoshal and Pritam.

Since then Ganjawala has worked for many music directors like Anu Malik, Anand–Milind, Nadeem-Shravan, Pritam, Himesh Reshammiya, Ismail Darbar, Shankar–Ehsaan–Loy, Anand Raj Anand, Rajesh Roshan, Viju Shah, Aadesh Shrivastava, Roop Kumar Rathod, Daboo Malik, and Sanjeev-Darshan. Kunal recently sang for Sanjay Leela Bhansali's Saawariya. His numbers from the films Maashah Alaah and Pari were running top on the chart.

Other than Hindi and Kannada, he has also sung in Tamil, Marathi, Punjabi, Odia, Bengali, Telugu, Malayalam, Assamese and Sindhi languages.

His song "Oh my love" from Bengali language movie Amanush Jeet Gannguli and "Channa Ve Ghar aa jaa" from a Punjabi album Channa Ve by DJ Anit & Music director Santokh Singh was also a success.

In 2007, he participated in a concert tour in North America, called The Incredibles, also featuring Asha Bhosle, Nigam and Kailash Kher.

On 3 April 2010 he performed at RECSTACY, the annual cultural event of NIT DURGAPUR. On 26 November 2010 he performed at SDM UTSAV, the mega fest event of SDMCET.

In February 2018, he recorded India's first jazzy ghazal Dhatt, for the Indian recording label Indian Talkie. The song was composed by Sumit and written by Zeest and is a blend of two completely different genres, Jazz and Ghazal. The song was released on Valentine's Day 2018 to over 300 music streaming platforms, including Saavn, iTunes Spotify, Deezer, and Wynk Music. The Lyrical Making Video was released on Indian Talkie's official YouTube Channel, featuring Ganjawala and Sumit and his team.

Personal life 
In 2005, he married fellow singer Gayatri Iyer. They performed the title track for STAR One's Antakshari together. He is a staunch devotee of Sri Sathya Sai Baba.

Awards and recognition 

Kunal Ganjawala has received the following recognitions:

|-
| rowspan= 3 | 2005
| rowspan= 5 | Murder
| Filmfare Awards
"Best Male Playback Singer"
"RD Burman Award for New Music Talent"(For: Bheege Honth Tere)
| rowspan=5 
|-
| IIFA Awards
"Best Male Playback" (For: Bheege Honth Tere)
|-
| Zee Cine Awards
"Best Playback Singer – Male"(For: Bheege Honth Tere)
|-
| rowspan= 2 | 2006
| Star Guild Awards
"Best Male Playback Singer"(For: Bheege Honth Tere)
|-
| Bollywood Movie Awards
"Bollywood Movie Award – Best Playback Singer Male"(For: Bheege Honth Tere)
|-
| 2009
| Mussanjemaatu
| 56th Filmfare Awards South
"Best Male Playback Singer"(For: Kaddalu Mansana)
|
|}

Discography

Hindi

Non-film

Kannada

Bengali

Tamil

Telugu

Marathi

Punjabi

Malayalam

Odia

Urdu

Assamese

Tulu

References

External links 
 

Living people
Indian male playback singers
Kannada playback singers
Bollywood playback singers
Sa Re Ga Ma Pa participants
Musicians from Mumbai
Elphinstone College alumni
Indian Hindus
1972 births
Filmfare Awards winners
International Indian Film Academy Awards winners
Zee Cine Awards winners